A foundation garment (also known as shapewear or shaping underwear) is an undergarment designed to impermanently alter the wearer's body shape, to achieve what some view as a more fashionable figure. The function of a foundation garment is not to enhance a bodily feature (as would, for example, a padded bra) but to make it look more presentable. 

Specific styles of foundation garments have been essential to some fashion movements, and were required in some social situations during various fashion periods.

History
Women have worn foundation garments, such as corsets and brassieres, for a very long time.

Foundation garments were patented by Marion M Chubby in 1965 (categorized in elastic corsets).

Debenhams recorded a 75% increase in shapewear sales between 2009 and 2013.

Description 
Foundation garments are worn to modify body shape. They usually require technological advances in garment design and lightweight fabrics to create different body figures. A foundation garment may be worn for a specific outfit. Being underwear, the foundation garment should not be visible under the outerwear.  A general-purpose "all the way" shaper with clear straps that starts at the bust and ends at the knee or mid-calf is also available.

Foundation garments may come with a built-in strapless bra for dresses and halters.

In a broader definition, a foundation garment is a piece of garment that provides body-redefining shapes such as a bra.

Garments may be categorized according to level of shape control offered, for instance, light, medium, or firm. The simplest foundation is a body-liner or bodysuit, which is an ultra-light-weight leotard and offers a light touch of smoothing. These are available in a unitard style (shortened legs) or a camisole-leotard style. The leotard is better and is available in boy-leg and capri-leg lengths, with spaghetti straps, low cut necklines, and even scoop backs, to cater to the outerwear under which the garments will be worn. These softly smooth the figure and provide light support. Micro-fiber camisoles and boy-leg briefs or "hot pants" are also available. Girdles are often called "body shapers" or "contour garments". These garments are made with more Lycra spandex as compared to the 10% Lycra / 90% cotton blend of most leotards, and they offer the highest level of shaping and support.

See also
 Lingerie

References

 
Lingerie
Corsetry